The Miami Dolphins are a professional American football team based in the Miami metropolitan area. They are members of the East Division of the American Football Conference (AFC) in the National Football League (NFL). Lawyer Joe Robbie and actor Danny Thomas were granted enfranchisement on August 15, 1965, committing their team as the ninth member of the American Football League (AFL).

The Dolphins have had 40 different starting quarterbacks (QB) in their franchise history; only George Mira and Tyler Thigpen have started only one game for the Dolphins. The Dolphins' first starting quarterback was Dick Wood during the first inaugural season game in 1966, against the Oakland Raiders; Wood however was replaced a week later by rookie Rick Norton due to inconsistency. Notable Dolphin starting quarterbacks include Pro Football Hall of Fame inductees Bob Griese and Dan Marino, who together combined for 391 total starts and 239 wins all with the Dolphins. Other standouts include Earl Morrall, Don Strock, David Woodley, Jay Fiedler, and Chad Pennington.

The Miami Dolphins entered the 2012 season with the franchise's 32nd different starting quarterback Ryan Tannehill. He is the first rookie to ever start on opening day for the Dolphins.

History

Inception
The Miami Dolphins entered their inaugural season in 1966 with Dick Wood as their starting quarterback against the Oakland Raiders. By the end of the first half Wood had thrown four interceptions, two of which translated to ten points by the Raiders. Rookie replacement Rick Norton finished the second half of the game and started the next two games against the New York Jets and Buffalo Bills. Trailing 41–3 against the Bills, Norton was benched in favor of rookie punter George Wilson Jr., who played quarterback in college at Xavier University. Wilson outscored the Bills 21–17 during his 40 minutes of playing time, throwing three touchdowns and passing for 185 yards.

Wilson went on to start the next seven games for the Dolphins. During that time Wilson collected the franchise's first and second victories against the Denver Broncos on October 16, and followed it up a week later with a victory against the Houston Oilers. However, during the week twelve game against the New York Jets, Wilson suffered a shoulder injury that sidelined him for the remainder of the season.

Dick Wood started the next three games for the Dolphins, but didn't finish the season as rookie quarterback John Stofa started the final game against the Houston Oilers. Stofa led the team to its third and final victory of the season by beating the Oilers, 29–28.

Bob Griese era
Bob Griese, a quarterback from Purdue, was selected by the Miami Dolphins as the fourth pick in the first round of the 1967 Common Draft. Entering the 1967 season, rookie Griese was slated to develop as a backup quarterback behind John Stofa. However, due to an ankle injury suffered during the first game of the season, Stofa was sidelined, and Griese finished the game leading the Dolphins to 35–21 victory over the Denver Broncos. Griese started the next two games, but sustained an injury during the Week 5 game against the New York Jets and was replaced by Rick Norton for three games. Griese resumed the role of starting QB for the remaining eight games of his rookie season.

For the next 13 seasons Griese started a majority of the Miami Dolphins' games. During that tenure Griese became the first Miami Dolphins quarterback to start all of the season's games in 1970, led by head coach Don Shula. In the same year the Dolphins collected their first winning season and playoff berth, but lost against the Oakland Raiders, 21–14, in the Divisional Round. The following year, 1971, the Dolphins made their first Super Bowl appearance against the Dallas Cowboys, but lost, 24–3.

In 1972 Griese started and won the first five games of the season, but fell victim to injury against the San Diego Chargers. Earl Morrall started and won the remaining nine games of season. Morrall started both the Divisional and AFC conference games, but Griese returned to start Super Bowl VII. Griese's 14–7 win against the Washington Redskins completed the NFL's first and only perfect season. Earl Morrall's performance earned him the NFL's inaugural Comeback Player of the Year Award. Starting 11 of the season's 17 games, contributions from his 1972 season and further performances in his career have listed him as one of the top backup quarterbacks in NFL history.

In 1973 Griese started 13 regular-season games, and led the Dolphins to their third consecutive Super Bowl appearance, the first in NFL history and second consecutive Super Bowl victory in Super Bowl VIII, the second in NFL history.

Over the next seven years Griese started 74 regular-season and three playoff games. He sustained a multitude of injuries and shared the starting role with quarterbacks Morrall, Don Strock, and David Woodley, but finally in 1980, against the Baltimore Colts, Griese sustained a shoulder injury that would prompt him to retire at the end of the season.

In his career, Griese played in six Pro Bowls and two all-star games, was elected the Dolphins' MVP six times, and was named All-Pro in 1971 and 1977. Throughout the 1970s the Miami Dolphins had the highest winning percentage in all of professional sports. Griese was inducted into the Pro Football Hall of Fame in 1990.

Following the end of Griese's tenure, quarterback David Woodley became the Dolphins' starting quarterback and continued the Dolphins' success. Woodley made it to the playoffs in 1981 and in 1982. During the 1982 season the Dolphins lost in their fourth Super Bowl appearance against the Washington Redskins, 27–17. In 1983, Woodley lost the starting job to rookie quarterback Dan Marino. David Woodley is known as being the transition quarterback between Bob Griese and Dan Marino.

Dan Marino Era

Dan Marino, a quarterback from the University of Pittsburgh, was selected by the Miami Dolphins as the 27th pick, in the first round of the 1983 NFL Draft. Much like Griese, Marino was slated to develop under starting quarterback David Woodley. During the third game of the season against the Los Angeles Raiders, Marino saw his first action as an NFL quarterback, and passed for ninety yards and threw for two touchdowns. Following a loss during week 4, Marino replaced Woodley, and the following week started his first game against the Buffalo Bills. Miami, however, lost the game in overtime 38–35.

Starting quarterbacks by season

Regular season

Regular season stats
Stats through the 2022 season
Click on heading to sort

Postseason

Postseason stats

Postseason games

See also
 Lists of NFL starting quarterbacks

Notes
: In each game, a team picks one player to start in the quarterback (QB) position. Players may be substituted during the game, but the term "starting quarterback" refers to the player who started the game in that position.
: Strikes by the National Football League Players Association in the 1982 and 1987 seasons resulted in shortened seasons (9- and 15-game schedules, respectively).

References

	

Miami Dolphins
quarterbacks